Mattingly is an unincorporated community in Breckinridge County, Kentucky, United States.

History
Its original name was Balltown, prior to the post office opening there in 1881. Some of the early settlers were the Balls, Bateses, Franks, Harrises, McQuadys, Mullens and Pates.  The name Mattingly probably comes from the name of its first post master.

References

Unincorporated communities in Breckinridge County, Kentucky
Unincorporated communities in Kentucky